The 1967–68 Danish 1. division season was the 11th season of ice hockey in Denmark. Eight teams participated in the league, and Gladsaxe SF won the championship. Hellerup IK was relegated.

Regular season

External links
Season on eliteprospects.com

Danish
1967 in Danish sport
1968 in Danish sport